Ewen Paul Thompson (born 17 December 1979) is a former New Zealand international cricketer who played in the Under-19 Cricket World Cup in 1998. Thompson has also played for Northland and Manawatu in the Hawke Cup. He was born in Warkworth.

Thompson was called up to the New Zealand squad at the age of 29 for the two Twenty20 Internationals against the West Indies in December 2008. He made his debut in the second match at Hamilton.

External links 
 

1979 births
New Zealand cricketers
New Zealand One Day International cricketers
New Zealand Twenty20 International cricketers
Central Districts cricketers
Living people
People from Warkworth, New Zealand